Košarkaški klub Partizan is a Serbian professional basketball club based in Belgrade, that competes in the Basketball League of Serbia, Adriatic League and Euroleague. The club was founded on 4 October 1945, as a basketball section of the Sports Association of the Central House of the Yugoslav Army. During its more than six decades long history, Partizan has won as many as 44 trophies. The "Black and White" players were the state champions twenty one times, they won the National Cup thirteen times, three times they won Korać Cup and they were champions of the Adriatic League six times. The most significant trophy the club has won is the European Champion trophy at the Final Four of the European Champion's Cup in Istanbul in 1992.

Seasons

Notes

References
 https://web.archive.org/web/20120921221616/http://www.kkpartizan.rs/trofeji/
 http://www.kkpartizan.rs/sr/istorijat

External links
 Official website